Catherine Burton  may refer to:

Katherine Burton, religious biographer and social activist
Cathy Burton, fictional character in novel, This Can't Be Happening at Macdonald Hall
Catharine Burton, nun

See also
Kate Burton (disambiguation)
Burton (surname)